The Iris was an express train that linked Brussels Midi/Zuid in Brussels, Belgium, with Chur station in Chur, Switzerland.

Introduced in 1974, the train was operated by the National Railway Company of Belgium (NMBS/SNCB), the Chemins de Fer Luxembourgeois (CFL), the French National Railway Corporation (SNCF) and the Swiss Federal Railways (SBB-CFF-FFS).  It was named after a flower, the Yellow Iris (Iris pseudacorus), which was widespread in the Zenne/Senne valley, where Brussels is located.

Initially, the Iris was a first-class-only Trans Europ Express (TEE).  In 1981, it became a two-class InterCity (IC), and on 31 May 1987, it was included in the then-new EuroCity (EC) network.  , the Iris was one of two EuroCity train-pairs running daily between Brussels and Switzerland; the other was the Vauban.

History
The eastbound service was cut back to Brussels–Basel in December 2011; in December 2013 the latter was also cut back to start in Basel.

The service was discontinued on April 3 2016, alongside the introduction of a high-speed TGV service to Strasbourg.

See also

 History of rail transport in Belgium
 History of rail transport in Luxembourg
 History of rail transport in France
 History of rail transport in Switzerland
 List of EuroCity services
 List of named passenger trains of Europe

References

Notes

Bibliography

External links

Rail.lu: Iris – images of the train

EuroCity
International named passenger trains
Named passenger trains of Belgium
Named passenger trains of Luxembourg
Named passenger trains of France
Named passenger trains of Switzerland
Railway services introduced in 1974
Trans Europ Express